The 2004 Vancouver Women's Open was a women's tennis tournament played on outdoor hard courts that was part of the Tier V category of the 2004 WTA Tour. It was the third edition of the tournament and took place in Vancouver, Canada from 9 August until 15 August 2004.

Nicole Vaidišová won the singles edition, whilst the American team of Bethanie Mattek and Abigail Spears emerged victorious in the doubles category.

Singles main-draw entrants

Seeds 

 Rankings are as of August 2, 2014.

Other entrants 
The following players received wildcards into the main draw:
  Maureen Drake
  Marie-Ève Pelletier

The following players received entry from the qualifying draw:
  María Vanina García Sokol
  Sessil Karatantcheva
  Seiko Okamoto
  Nicole Vaidišová

Results

Singles 
 Nicole Vaidišová defeated  Laura Granville, 2–6, 6–4, 6–2
 It was Vaidošová's 1st career singles title

Doubles 
 Bethanie Mattek /  Abigail Spears defeated  Els Callens /  Anna-Lena Grönefeld, 6–3, 6–3
 It was Mattek's first doubles title of her career, while it was the second title (and the first that season) for Spears.

References

External links 
 ITF tournament edition details

Vancouver Women's Open
Vancouver Open
Vancouver Women's Open
Vancouver Women's Open